Mother's Elling is a 2003 Norwegian comedy film directed by Eva Isaksen. It is one of a series of four films featuring the Elling character.
The film made $3,315,075 according to BoxOfficeMojo.

Cast 
 Per Christian Ellefsen – Elling
 Grete Nordrå – Mor
 Helge Reiss – Bugge-Høvik
 Christin Borge – Mag
  – Georg

References

External links 

2003 comedy films
2003 films
Norwegian comedy films
2000s Norwegian-language films